Michael Buchleitner (born 14 October 1969 in Mödling) is an Austrian long-distance runner.

Up to 1999 he specialized in the 3000 metres steeplechase. He finished tenth at the 1993 World Championships and competed without reaching the final in 1997 and 1999. He did, however, achieve a personal best time of 8:20.04 minutes at the latter event. Competing at the Universiade he won a gold medal in 1993 and a bronze in 1997. He also finished fifth in 3000 metres at the 2002 European Indoor Athletics Championships.

From 2000 he has concentrated on the marathon race. He competed in this event at the 2000 and 2004 Summer Olympics.

He married Ellen Kiessling, a German champion middle-distance runner, in 1994.

International competitions

Personal bests
3000 metres steeplechase - 8:20.04 min (1999)
5000 metres - 13:42.15 min (2000)
10,000 metres - 28:18.58 min (2000)
Half marathon - 1:02:39 hrs (2004)
Marathon - 2:12:43 hrs (1999)

References

1969 births
Living people
People from Mödling
Austrian male marathon runners
Austrian male long-distance runners
Austrian male steeplechase runners
Olympic athletes of Austria
Athletes (track and field) at the 1992 Summer Olympics
Athletes (track and field) at the 2000 Summer Olympics
Athletes (track and field) at the 2004 Summer Olympics
World Athletics Championships athletes for Austria
Paralympic sighted guides
Universiade medalists in athletics (track and field)
Universiade gold medalists for Austria
Sportspeople from Lower Austria
Medalists at the 1993 Summer Universiade
Medalists at the 1997 Summer Universiade